Flight 105 may refer to:
 Pennsylvania Central Airlines Flight 105, crashed on 6 January 1946
 Flight 105 UFO sighting of 1947
 Britannia Airways Flight 105, crashed on 1 September 1966
 Midwest Express Airlines Flight 105, crashed on 6 September 1985

0105